Oksana Oleksandrivna Shvets (10 February 1955 – 17 March 2022) was a Ukrainian actress. She worked for the Kyiv National Academic Molodyy Theatre from its foundation in 1980 until her death, and was awarded the title Merited Artist of Ukraine, one of the highest Ukrainian honours for performing artists, in 1996. She also appeared on stage at the Ternopil Music and Drama Theatre and the Kyiv Theatre of Satire. She played in film and on television, such as in the 2013 Russian-Ukrainian series House with Lilies.

Biography 
Born in Kyiv, Shvets was a graduate of the theatre studio at the Ivan Franko Theatre in 1975 and of the faculty of theatre studies of the I. K. Karpenko-Kary Theatre in 1986. She worked as an ensemble member of the Kyiv National Academic Molodyy Theatre (Young Theatre) from its foundation in 1980 until her death. The company lists many of her roles and plays. She played in the 2013 production of Гоголь-могол (Gogol Mogol) by Nikolai Erdman.

She appeared as Natasha in Anton Chekhov's Three Sisters, directed by O. Uteganov. It was directed by Andriy Bilous, the theatre's intendant. Theatre critic  praised her performance, finding complexities in the mother-in-law's character, not just bad temper. In a 2016 production of Поступися місцем! (Make Way!) by Viña Delmar, she played the role of Nemi. The play, filmed as Make Way for Tomorrow, and described as a sad comedy, was directed by Dmytro Veselsky.

In 1996, her long-time engagement and "outstanding achievement in the performing arts" was honoured with the title Merited Artist of Ukraine, one of the highest Ukrainian awards for performing artists.

While best known for her work on the stage, she played in several films and television series. She appeared in the film Завтра буде завтра (Tomorrow Will Be Tomorrow). Her first television series was Nasledniki (Heirs) in 1976, playing a minor role. In 2003, she appeared in an episode of Повернення Мухтара (Mukhtar Returns), an action-adventure series in Russian running for almost 20 years. She starred in all eight episodes of the Ukrainian series Таємниця Святого Патріка (The Mystery of Saint Patrick) in 2006. In 2013, she appeared in Russian-Ukrainian Дім з ліліями (House with Lilies), a TV series about fictional war hero Michail Govorov and his family from World War II to 2013, as the director of an orphanage.

Death
On 17 March 2022, during the Russian invasion of Ukraine, Shvets died in a shelling attack by Russian troops on a Kyiv residential building where she lived.

See also 
 List of productions at the Kyiv National Academic Molodyy Theatre

Notes

References

Further reading

External links
 

1955 births
2022 deaths
20th-century Ukrainian actresses
21st-century Ukrainian actresses
Actors from Kyiv
Kyiv National I. K. Karpenko-Kary Theatre, Cinema and Television University alumni
Deaths by airstrike during the 2022 Russian invasion of Ukraine
Civilians killed in the Russian invasion of Ukraine
Ukrainian film actresses
Ukrainian stage actresses
Ukrainian television actresses
Recipients of the title of Merited Artist of Ukraine